Queen Victoria was the monarch of the United Kingdom of Great Britain and Ireland and of the British Empire from 20 June 1837 until her death on 22 January 1901. At the start of her reign, responsible government outside of the United Kingdom itself was unknown, but starting in the 1840s this would change.

During her reign Victoria was served by well over 33 prime ministers: 15 from New Zealand, 10 from the United Kingdom, 7 from the Dominion of Canada and 1 from Australia.

Australia

Canada

Pre-Confederation

New Brunswick

Newfoundland

Nova Scotia
Nova Scotia became the very first colony to have permanent responsible government in the history of the British Empire.

Became part of Canada in 1867

Prince Edward Island

Became Part of Canada in 1873

Post-Confederation 1867-1901

Cape Colony

New Zealand
From 1856 until 1869 the office now referred to as prime minister of New Zealand was called colonial secretary and from 1869 until 1907 was called premier of New Zealand.

United Kingdom

See also
British Empire
Constitutional monarchy

References

British Empire-related lists
Commonwealth realms
Queen Victoria
Victoria, Prime Ministers
Victoria